Jacqueline Durran is a British costume designer. She received considerable attention for her work on Pride & Prejudice (2005), for which she was nominated for both an Academy Award for Best Costume Design and BAFTA Award for Best Costume Design. She has won two Academy Awards for Costume Design for the period films Anna Karenina (2012) and Little Women (2020), and has been nominated eight times for the award. She has also been nominated nine times for a BAFTA Award, winning for Vera Drake (2004), Anna Karenina, and Little Women. Durran has been a frequent collaborator with directors Mike Leigh and Joe Wright, having designed the costumes for six times on Leigh's films and seven times on Wright's films.

Selected film credits

Selected television credits

Selected stage credits 
 Medea (December 2002 – February 2003) Brooks Atkinson Theatre in New York City by director Deborah Warner

Accolades

External links

Living people
British costume designers
English costume designers
Alumni of the Royal College of Art
Alumni of the University of Sussex
Best Costume Design Academy Award winners
Best Costume Design BAFTA Award winners
Women costume designers
Year of birth missing (living people)